Ellison Elementary School may refer to:

Ellison Elementary School in School District 22 Vernon in British Columbia
Ellison Elementary School in School District 23 Central Okanagan in Kelowna, British Columbia